Crinitodiscus is a genus of mites in the family Trachyuropodidae. There are at least two described species in Crinitodiscus.

Species
These two species belong to the genus Crinitodiscus:
 Crinitodiscus ayyildizi
 Crinitodiscus ozkani

References

Mesostigmata
Articles created by Qbugbot